Siaha District is one of the eleven districts of Mizoram state in India. The district is bounded on the northwest by Lunglei district, on the north and west by Lawngtlai District and on the south and east by Myanmar. The district occupies an area of 1399.9 km2. Siaha town is the administrative headquarters of the Mara Autonomous District Council. The population had decreased from 60,823 (in 2001 census) to 56,574 (in 2011 census). It is the least populous district of Mizoram (out of 8).

History
Siaha District was formerly part of Chhimtuipui District. In 1998 when Chhimtuipui District was split in half, the half that became Saiha District was briefly called by the old name Chhimtuipui District. In 2016 Saiha District was renamed to Siaha District following the rename of Siaha town in the previous year.

Geography
Siaha is the administrative headquarters of Siaha district. It is the third largest town in Mizoram after Aizawl, the state capital and Lunglei. Tipa, Laki, Zyhno, Phura and No-ao-tlah are the other main towns in Siaha district. From north to south of this district lies Lawngtlai District, to the north and northwest is Lunglei District, to the south and east lies Myanmar.

Economy
In 2006 the Ministry of Panchayati Raj named Siaha one of the country's 250 most backward districts (out of a total of 640). It is one of the two districts in Mizoram currently receiving funds from the Backward Regions Grant Fund Programme (BRGF).

Divisions
The district has 2 R.D. Blocks, Siaha also known as Siaha, and Tuipang also known as Tipa V. The 2 assembly constituencies in this district are Siaha and Tuipang.

Demographics

According to the 2011 census Siaha district has a population of 56,574, roughly equal to the island of Greenland. This gives it a ranking of 628th in India (out of a total of 640). Its population growth rate over the decade 2001-2011 was −7.34%; the only district in Mizoram to have decreased population. Siaha has a sex ratio of 979 females for every 1000 males, and a literacy rate of 90.01%.

The majority of the district inhabitants are Mara people, who also have an autonomous district council called Mara Autonomous District Council composed of the two R.D. Blocks of Siaha and Tuipang.

Flora and fauna

References

External links
 Siaha.nic.in: Siaha district official website
 Maraland.net: The home of Mara people on the internet
Saiha district

'''

 
Districts of Mizoram
1998 establishments in Mizoram